Maurício Souza may refer to:

 Maurício Souza (footballer) (born 1974), Brazilian football manager and former footballer
 Maurício Souza (volleyball) (born 1988), Brazilian volleyball player

Portuguese name
 Mauricio de Sousa (born 1935), Brazilian cartoonist and businessperson